The Mirror Building also called the Butterfield Overland Mail Company Los Angeles Building was a large building in the City of Los Angeles. Butterfield Overland Mail Company built the large brick building in 1858. The Mirror Building was designated a California Historic Landmark (No.744) on July 5, 1960. The Mirror Building had business offices and housing space for traveling workers. There was a large stable in the back of the buildings for the horses, along with a large workshop to repair the stagecoaches. The first Butterfield Overland Mail stagecoach from St. Louis to arrive was on October 7, 1858. The Butterfield Overland Mail Company was founded by John Butterfield, he later would be the founder of American Express. While the Mirror Building was being built the Butterfield Overland Mail Company rented space from the Bella Union Hotel. The Los Angeles Butterfield Overland Mail Company closed in 1861.

In 1861 the Mirror Building became the Office of U.S. Quartermaster. The U.S. Quartermaster use the stable for army horses and mules. The stable also had space to support the camels used at Fort Tejon and other west outpost. From 1858, Fort Tejon was the western terminus of the experimental U.S. Camel Corps, which used imported camels in an effort to carry supplies across arid regions in the Southwest. The soldiers found the camels hardy, but temperamental, and they spooked the horses used by the cavalry.
 
From 1884 to 1888 the Mirror Building was used as Los Angeles City Hall. The site of the former Mirror Building is now Los Angeles Times Building at 202 West 1st Street built in 1935. The current Times Building has a small museum about the Mirror Building and other offices that were on the site, located at 125 South Spring Street. The 1947 New Times Building, is sometimes called Mirror Building due to the site of the original Mirror Building.

The Mirror Building received its name later from the Mirror Printing Office and Book Bindery. Mirror Printing Office became the owners of Los Angeles Daily Times in 1882.
The downtown Los Angeles block that the Mirror Building was on is also the location of the Los Angeles School No. 1 built in 1855. This was the first brick school house in Los Angeles. The School was paid for by the new California education property tax assessment started in 1852, which gave schools five cents per $100 of taxable property value. The school was at the northwest corner of Spring and Second streets and cost $6,000 to build. The two story School opened on March 19, 1855.

Markers
State Marker on the site reads (The historical plaque is located around the on Second Street. ):
NO. 744 THE MIRROR BUILDING (SITE OF BUTTERFIELD STAGE STATION) – The Butterfield Overland Mail Company took an option on this piece of property in August 1858 and acquired it on December 7, 1859. A large brick building containing offices and living quarters, with shops and stables in the rear, was completed in 1860. With the exception of the station at El Paso, Texas, this was the largest and best equipped station on the entire route."
 A 1949 maker placed the by Native Daughters of the Golden West reads"This block is the site of:First brick school house in Los Angeles known as School No. 1, built 1854–1855;Butterfield Overland Mail Company office and corral, 1858–1861;Office of U.S. Quartermaster, 1861;Corral for camels from Fort Tejon, 1861;and Los Angeles City Hall, built 1884.''

See also
California Historical Landmarks in Los Angeles County 
List of California Ranchos

Times Mirror Company
Butterfield Overland Mail in California
 Stockton - Los Angeles Road
Central Business District, Los Angeles (1880s-1890s)
Temescal Butterfield stage station

External links
 Desert USA.com: John Butterfield + Butterfield Overland Mail Unfortunately this article is not primary source reference and contains some errors. Wells Fargo Co. did not take over Butterfield's Overland Mail Company.
 Over-land.com: Official Millennium Trail—The Overland Trail
 1958 Overland Mail Centennial U.S. commemorative stamp
 "Panning for history along Cache la Poudre River" The Moultrie News (Charleston, SC) Article about the Central Overland Trail
 Texas Historical Society: Butterfield Overland Mail Company in Bridgeport
 Butterfield Express under the Confederate States of America

References

California Historical Landmarks
1858 establishments in California